

Wilhelm Heun (23 May 1895 – 21 September 1986) was a German general during World War II. He was a recipient of the Knight's Cross of the Iron Cross of Nazi Germany.

Awards and decorations

 Knight's Cross of the Iron Cross on 9 December 1944 as Generalmajor and commander of 83. Infanterie-Division

References

Citations

Bibliography

 

1895 births
1986 deaths
Lieutenant generals of the German Army (Wehrmacht)
German Army personnel of World War I
Recipients of the clasp to the Iron Cross, 1st class
Recipients of the Gold German Cross
Recipients of the Knight's Cross of the Iron Cross
German prisoners of war in World War II held by the United States
People from Lahn-Dill-Kreis
People from Hesse-Nassau
Military personnel from Hesse